Naticidae, common name moon snails or necklace shells, is a family of medium to large-sized predatory sea snails, marine gastropod molluscs in the clade Littorinimorpha. The shells of the species in this family are mostly globular in shape.

Naticidae is the only family in the superfamily Naticoidea.

It has been estimated that worldwide there are about 260–270 recent species of naticid snails. This group is assumed to have originated in the late Triassic or in the early Jurassic. Members of this family can be recognized by the shape of their shells, distinct appearance, or by their predatory behavior.

Distribution
Naticids are widely distributed and occur worldwide. The greatest diversity of both species and genera is found in tropical regions. Even so, naticid snails are also plentiful in temperate, Arctic and Antarctic waters.

Habitat
Moon snails live on sandy substrates, at a great variety of depths depending on the species (from the intertidal zone to thousands of meters in depth). They are often seen ploughing along in the sand, searching for bivalvic and other prey, resulting in countersunk bore-holes.

Life habits

 

Naticids are predatory, feeding mostly on bivalves. They will also attack almost any other shelled mollusk they encounter in the sand, such as scaphopods and other gastropods, including other moon snails. Additionally, Conuber sordidum was shown to prey on the soldier crab Mictyris longicarpus (Crustacea) by drilling predation. To catch soldier crabs, C. sordidum uses the same behaviour as when hunting shelled molluscan prey.

The moon snail envelops the prey and then bores a hole through the shell using its radula and an acid secretion. Once the shell is bored open, the proboscis is used to consume the flesh of the prey. The hole in the shell, which has a "countersunk" appearance with chamfered edges, and which varies in size according to the species, is a characteristic diagnostic sign of moon snail predation.

In the breeding season, the female moon snail lays a rather stiff egg mass which includes sand and mucus. These objects wash up on sandy beaches fairly often, and are known by the common name "sand collars" because of their resemblance to an old-fashioned removable shirt collar or false-collar.

Human Interaction 

In Korean cuisine, moon snails are called golbaengi and eaten as golbaengi-muchim (moon snail salad).

Moon snail shells are attractive and relatively large, and often popular in jewellery and ornamentation.

Taxonomy

Traditional classification 
Some authors have suggested a distinct separation of the Naticidae into four subfamilies: Ampullospirinae, Naticinae, Polinicinae and Sininae. This arrangement is mainly based on morphological data, such as details of the operculum including the material (calcareous in the Naticinae, corneous in the Polinicinae and Sininae) and size, and also the morphology of the shell.

2005 taxonomy 
The following four subfamilies were recognized in the taxonomy of Bouchet & Rocroi (2005):

 Naticinae Guilding, 1834 - synonyms: Neveritinae Gray, 1857; Choristidae Verrill, 1882; Euspiridae Cossmann, 1907; Mammillinae Iredale & McMichael, 1962; Eunaticinini Oyama, 1469
 Sininae Woodring, 1928 - synonyms: Sigaretidae Gary, 1827; Cryptostomidae Gray, 1827
 Globisininae Powell, 1933
 Polinicinae Gray, 1847

Genera 
Genera in the family Naticidae include:

Unassigned to a subfamily:
 Haliotinella Souverbie, 1875
 Microlinices Simone, 2014

subfamily Naticinae
 Cochlis Röding, 1798
 Cryptonatica Dall, 1892
 Lunaia Berry, 1964: synonym of Natica Scopoli, 1777
 Natica Scopoli, 1777
 Naticarius Duméril, 1806
 Notocochlis Powell, 1933
 Paratectonatica Azuma, 1961
 Proxiuber Powell, 1933
 Stigmaulax Mörch, 1852
 Tanea Marwick, 1931
 † Taniella Finlay & Marwick, 1937 
 Tasmatica Finlay & Marwick, 1937
 Tectonatica Sacco, 1890

subfamily Globisininae
 Falsilunatia Powell, 1951
 Globisinum Marwick, 1924

subfamily Polinicinae Gray, 1847
 Amauropsis Mörch, 1857
 Bulbus Brown, 1839
 Conuber Finlay & Marwick, 1937
 Euspira Agassiz in Sowerby, 1838
 Friginatica Hedley, 1916
 Glossaulax Pilsbry, 1929
 Hypterita Woodring, 1957
 Kerguelenatica Powell, 1951
 Laguncula Benson, 1842
 Lunatia Gray, 1847
 Mammilla Schumacher, 1817
 Neverita Risso, 1826 - its subgenus or synonym includes Glossaulax Pilsbry, 1929 
 Polinices Montfort, 1810 
 Pseudopolinices Golikov & Sirenko, 1983
 Sinuber Powell, 1951
 Uberella Finlay, 1928

subfamily Sininae
 Calinaticina J. Q. Burch & Campbell, 1963
 Eunaticina Fischer, 1885
 Gennaeosinum Iredale, 1929
 Payraudeautia Bucquoy, Dautzenberg & Dollfus, 1883
 Sigatica Meyer and Aldrich, 1886
 Sinum Röding, 1798

subfamily ?
 Acrybia Adams, 1853: synonym of Bulbus T. Brown, 1839
 Gyrodes Conrad, 1860
 Spironema Meek, 1864

References

Further reading
 Powell A. W. B. 1979. New Zealand Mollusca, William Collins Publishers Ltd, Auckland, New Zealand 
 Ponder W. & Lindberg D. 1997. Towards a phylogeny of gastropod molluscs; an analysis using morphological characters. Zoological Journal of the Linnean Society, 119: 83-265, London, .

 Colgan D.J. et al. 2007. Molecular phylogenetics of Caenogastropoda (Gastropoda: Mollusca). Molecular Phylogenetics and Evolution, 42, 717-37.
 Torigoe K. & Inaba A. (2011) Revision on the classification of Recent Naticidae. Bulletin of the Nishinomiya Shell Museum 7: 133 + 15 pp., 4 pls.

External links 

 CLEMAM - Taxonomic Database on European Marine Mollusca of the Muséum National d'Histoire Naturelle and the Department of Systematics & Evolution, Paris.
 The Naticidae of Giglio Island at Morphobank - Homology of phenotypes over the web
 Malacolog 4.1.0 - A Database of Western Atlantic Marine Mollusca
 
 Naturamediterraneo - Mediterranean fauna and flora
 Publications and sequences of the Naticidae submitted to the NCBI
 Miocene Gastropods and Biostratigraphy of the Kern River Area, California; United States Geological Survey Professional Paper 642 

 
Articles containing video clips
Gastropod families